The Yongchuan railway station is a railway station on the Chengdu–Chongqing railway. The station is located in Yongchuan District, Chongqing, China.

See also
Chengdu–Chongqing railway

Stations on the Chengdu–Chongqing Railway
Railway stations in Chongqing
Railway stations in China opened in 1953